This is a list of animated feature films released in 2009.

Highest Grossing animated films of the year

See also
 List of animated television series of 2009

References

 Feature films
2009
2009-related lists